The women's 10,000 metres at the 2002 European Athletics Championships were held at the Olympic Stadium on 6 August.

Results

External links

10000
10,000 metres at the European Athletics Championships
Marathons in Germany
2002 in women's athletics